The Campaigns of Robert E. Lee is a board game published in 1988 by Clash of Arms Games.

Contents
The Campaigns of Robert E. Lee is a game in which the large area for this strategic game includes battlefields from Virginia to Pennsylvania.

Reception
Mike Siggins reviewed The Campaigns of Robert E. Lee for Games International magazine, and gave it 4 stars out of 5, and stated that "There is not a great deal new or revolutionary in The Campaigns of Robert E Lee, but what is there works extremely well."

References

Board games introduced in 1988
Clash of Arms games